Joseph March (born June 18, 1967) is a former arena football offensive lineman and defensive lineman in the Arena Football League for the Denver Dynamite, Sacramento Attack, Miami Hooters, Tampa Bay Storm and the Nashville Kats. He played college football at Murray State University. In 2000, March was inducted into the Arena Football Hall of Fame.

College career
March attended Murray State University where he was a member of the football team. March had a productive 1987 season for the Racers, registering 14.0 tackles for loss, including a 3.0 sack game against Middle Tennessee State.

Professional career

Denver Dynamite
March signed with the Denver Dynamite of the Arena Football League in 1991. As a rookie, March had 12.5 sacks, on his way to being named a First Team All-Arena Selection.

Sacramento Attack
March played with the Sacramento Attack in 1992.

Miami Hooters
In 1993, the Attack relocated to Miami, Florida and became the Miami Hooters. On June 14, 1993, March was traded to the Tampa Bay Storm for Willie Cannon and Reggie Berry.

Tampa Bay Storm
March helped lead the Storm to an ArenaBowl Championship in 1993 follow his trade from Miami. While in Tampa Bay, March helped the Storm win 3 titles in 4 years (1993, 1995, 1996).

Nashville Kats
March finished his career following playing the 1997 season with the Nashville Kats.

References

1967 births
Living people
American football offensive linemen
American football defensive linemen
Murray State Racers football players
Denver Dynamite (arena football) players
Sacramento Attack players
Miami Hooters players
Tampa Bay Storm players
Nashville Kats players